The 1983 FIBA Intercontinental Cup William Jones was the 17th edition of the FIBA Intercontinental Cup for men's basketball clubs and the 16th edition of the tournament in the form of a true intercontinental cup. It took place at Buenos Aires, Argentina.

Participants

League stage
Day 1, September 20 1983

|}

Day 2, September 21 1983

|}

Day 3, September 22 1983

|}

Day 4, September 23 1983

|}

Day 5, September 24 1983

|}

Final standings

External links
 1983 Intercontinental Cup William Jones

1983
1983–84 in Italian basketball
1983–84 in South American basketball
1983–84 in American college basketball
1983
1983 in Argentine sport
International basketball competitions hosted by Argentina